Florence Lawrence (born Florence Annie Bridgwood; January 2, 1886 – December 28, 1938) was a Canadian-American stage performer and film actress. She is often referred to as the "first movie star", and was long thought to be the first film actor to be named publicly until evidence published in 2019 indicated that the first named film star was French actor Max Linder. At the height of her fame in the 1910s, she was known as the "Biograph Girl" for work as one of the leading ladies in silent films from the Biograph Company. She appeared in almost 300 films for various motion picture companies throughout her career.

Early life
Born Florence Annie Bridgwood in Hamilton, Ontario, she was youngest of three children of George Bridgwood, an English-born carriage builder and Charlotte "Lotta" Bridgwood (née Dunn), a vaudeville actress. Charlotte Bridgwood had emigrated to Canada from Ireland after the Great Famine with her family as a child. She was known professionally as Lotta Lawrence and was the leading lady and director of the Lawrence Dramatic Company. At the age of three, Lawrence made her debut onstage with her mother in a song and dance routine. When she was old enough to memorize lines of dialogue, she performed with her mother and other members of the Lawrence Dramatic Company in dramatic plays. After performing tear-jerking dramas like Dora Thorne and East Lynne began to depress Lawrence, her mother dropped them from the company's repertoire. While Lawrence performed on stage at the behest of her mother, she recalled that she enjoyed the work but did not like the traveling that all vaudeville performers were required to do. By the age of six, Lawrence had earned the nickname "Baby Flo, the Child Wonder".

On February 18, 1898, George Bridgwood died from accidental coal gas poisoning at his home in Hamilton (Lawrence's parents had been separated since she was four years old). Lotta Lawrence moved the family from Hamilton to Buffalo, New York to live with her mother Ann Dunn. She chose to stop bringing her children along for stage performances and for the first time, Florence was enrolled in school. After graduating, Lawrence rejoined her mother's dramatic company. However, her mother disbanded the Lawrence Dramatic Company shortly thereafter; the two moved to New York City around 1906.

Early career: film and stage

Lawrence was one of several Canadian pioneers in the film industry who were attracted by the rapid growth of the fledgling motion picture business. In 1906, she appeared in her first motion picture. The next year, she appeared in 38 movies for the Vitagraph film company. During the spring and summer of 1906, Lawrence auditioned for a number of Broadway productions, but she did not have success. However, on December 27, 1906, she was hired by the Edison Manufacturing Company to play Daniel Boone's daughter in Daniel Boone; or, Pioneer Days in America. She got the part because she knew how to ride a horse. Both she and her mother received parts and were paid five dollars per day for two weeks of outdoor filming in freezing weather.

In 1907, she went to work for the Vitagraph Company in Brooklyn, New York, acting as Moya, an Irish peasant girl in a one-reel version of Dion Boucicault's The Shaughraun. She returned briefly to stage acting, playing the leading role in a road show production of Melville B. Raymond's Seminary Girls. Her mother played her last role in this production. After touring with the roadshow for a year, Lawrence resolved that she would "never again lead that gypsy life". In 1908, she returned to Vitagraph where she played the lead role in The Dispatch Beare. Largely as a result of her equestrian skills, she received parts in 11 films in the next five months.

Biograph Studios
Also at Vitagraph was a young actor, Harry Solter, who was looking for "a young, beautiful equestrian girl" to star in a film to be produced by the Biograph Studios under the direction of D. W. Griffith. Griffith, the most prominent producer-director at Biograph Studios, had noticed the beautiful blonde-haired woman in one of Vitagraph's films. Because the film's actors received no mention, Griffith had to make discreet inquiries to learn she was Florence Lawrence and to arrange a meeting. Griffith had intended to give the part to Florence Turner, Biograph's leading lady, but Lawrence managed to convince Solter and Griffith that she was the best suited for the starring role in The Girl and the Outlaw. With the Vitagraph Company, she had been earning $20 per week, working also as a costume seamstress over and above acting. Griffith offered her a job, acting only, for $25 per week.

After her success in this role, she appeared as a society belle in Betrayed by a Handprint and as an Indian in The Red Girl. In total, she had parts in most of the 60 films directed by Griffith in 1908. Toward the end of 1908, Lawrence married Harry Solter. Lawrence gained much popularity, but because her name never was publicized, fans began writing to the studio asking to know her identity. Even after she had gained wide recognition, particularly after starring in the highly successful Resurrection, Biograph Studios refused to publicly announce her name and fans simply called her the "Biograph Girl". During cinema's formative years, silent screen actors were not named because studio owners feared that fame might lead to demands for higher wages and because many actors were embarrassed to be performing pantomime in motion pictures. She continued to work for Biograph in 1909. Her demand to be paid by the week rather than daily was met, and she received double the normal rate.

She achieved great popularity in the "Jones" series, film's first comedy series, in which she played Mrs. Jones in around a dozen films, with John R. Cumpson as Mr. Jones. More popular still were the dramatic love stories in which she co-starred with Arthur Johnson: The two played husband and wife in The Ingrate, and the adulterous lovers in Resurrection. Lawrence and Solter began to look elsewhere for work, writing to the Essanay Company to offer their services as leading lady and director. Rather than accepting this offer, however, Essanay reported the offer to Biograph's head office, and they promptly were fired.

Independent Moving Pictures Company

Finding themselves 'at liberty', Lawrence and Solter in 1909 were able to join the Independent Moving Pictures Company of America (IMP). The company, founded by Carl Laemmle, the owner of a film exchange (who later absorbed IMP into Universal Pictures, of which he was founder and president), was looking for experienced filmmakers and actors. Needing a star, he lured Lawrence away from Biograph by promising to give her a marquee. First, Laemmle organized a publicity stunt by starting a rumor that Lawrence had been killed by a street car in New York City. Then, after gaining much media attention, he placed ads in the newspapers that announced "We nail a lie" and included a photo of Lawrence. The ad declared she is alive and well and making The Broken Oath, a new movie for his IMP Film Company to be directed by Solter.

Laemmle had Lawrence make a personal appearance in St. Louis, Missouri in March 1910 with her leading man to show her fans that she was very much alive, making her one of the early performers not already famous in another medium to be identified by name by her studio.

The fans in St. Louis were so thrilled to see Lawrence alive that they grabbed at her and popped the buttons off her coat. Laemmle used this to generate further attention by falsely claiming that Lawrence's St. Louis fans rushed her in a frenzy and tore her clothes off. Partially due to Laemmle's ingenuity, the "star system" was born, and before long, Florence Lawrence became a household name. However, her fame also proved that the studio executives who had concerns over wage demands soon had their fears proved correct. Laemmle managed to lure William V. Ranous, one of Vitagraph's better directors, over to IMP. Ranous introduced Laemmle to Lawrence and Solter, and they began to work together. Lawrence and Solter worked for IMP for 11 months, making 50 films. After this, they went on vacation in Europe.

When they returned to the United States, they joined a film company headed by Siegmund Lubin, described as the "wisest and most democratic film producer in history". She once again teamed with Arthur Johnson, and the pair made 48 films together under Lubin's direction. At the time, the film industry was controlled by the Motion Picture Patents Company (MPPC), a trust formed by the major film companies. IMP was not a member of the MPPC, and hence operated outside its distribution system. Theaters found showing IMP films lost the right to screen MPPC films. IMP, therefore, had powerful enemies in the film industry. It managed to survive largely due to Lawrence's popularity.

Lubin Studios
By late 1910, Lawrence left IMP to work for Lubin Studios, advising her fellow Canadian, the 18-year-old Mary Pickford, to take her place as IMP's star.

Victor Film Company

In 1912, Lawrence and Solter made a deal with Carl Laemmle, forming their own company. Laemmle gave them complete artistic freedom in the company, named Victor Film Company, and paid Lawrence $500 per week as the leading lady, and Solter $200 per week as director. They established a film studio in Fort Lee, New Jersey and made a number of films starring Lawrence and Owen Moore, then sold to the Universal Pictures in 1913. With this new prosperity, Florence was able to realize a 'lifelong dream,' buying a  estate in River Vale, New Jersey. In August 1912, she had a fight with her husband, in which he "made cruel remarks about his mother-in-law". He left and went to Europe. However, he wrote "sad" letters to her every day, telling her of his plans to commit suicide. His letters "softened her feelings", and they were re-united in November 1912. Lawrence announced her intention to retire.

She was persuaded to return to work in 1914 for her company (Victor Film Company), which had been acquired by Universal Studios. During the filming of Pawns of Destiny in 1915, a staged fire got out of control. Lawrence was burned, her hair was singed, and she suffered a serious fall which fractured her spine. She went into shock for months. She returned to work, but collapsed after the film was completed. To add to her problems, Universal refused to pay her medical expenses, leaving Lawrence feeling betrayed. In mid-1916, she returned to work for Universal and completed Elusive Isabel. However, the strain of working took its toll on her, and she suffered a serious relapse. She was completely paralyzed for four months. In 1921, she traveled to Hollywood to attempt a comeback, but had little success. She received a leading role in a minor melodrama (The Unfoldment), and then two supporting roles. All her film work after 1924 was in uncredited bit parts.

Personal life
Lawrence was married three times and had no children. Her first marriage was to actor, screenwriter and director Harry Solter in 1908. They remained married until Solter's death in 1920. She then married automobile salesman Charles Byrne Woodring in 1921. They separated in 1929; Lawrence was granted an interlocutory divorce in February 1931, which was finalized the following year. During the 1920s, Lawrence and Woodring opened a cosmetics store in Los Angeles called Hollywood Cosmetics. The store sold theatrical makeup and also sold a line of cosmetics that Lawrence developed. They continued their partnership after their separation in 1929, but the store was forced to close in 1931.

In 1933, Lawrence wed for the third and final time, to Henry Bolton, who turned out to be an abusive alcoholic and beat her severely. The union lasted five months.

Besides her film career, Lawrence is credited with designing the first "auto signaling arm", a predecessor of the modern turn signal, along with the first mechanical brake signal. She did not patent these inventions, however, and as a result she received no credit for, nor profit from, either one.

Later years 
By the late 1920s, Lawrence's popularity had declined and she suffered several personal losses. She was devastated when her mother, to whom she was close, died suddenly in August 1929. Four months later, she separated from her second husband, Charles Woodring. While Lawrence earned a small fortune during her film career, she made many poor business decisions. She lost much of her fortune after the stock market crash in October 1929 and ensuing Great Depression. The cosmetics store that she and her second husband opened in Los Angeles also lost business because of the Depression, and the couple was forced to close its doors in 1931.

By the early 1930s, Lawrence's acting career consisted solely of extra and bit parts which were often uncredited. In 1936, Metro-Goldwyn-Mayer studio head Louis B. Mayer began giving extra and bit parts to former silent film actors for $75 per week. Lawrence, along with other "old timers" from the silent era whose careers had all but ended when sound films replaced silent films, signed with M-G-M. Lawrence remained with the studio until her death.

In mid-1937, Lawrence was diagnosed with what her doctor described as "a bone disease which produces anemia and depression." The disease was likely myelofibrosis, a rare bone marrow disease, or agnogenic myeloid metaplasia, both of which were incurable at the time. Due to her poor health and chronic pain, Lawrence became depressed but attempted to keep working. Around this time she moved into a home on Westbourne Drive in West Hollywood, with a studio worker named Robert "Bob" Brinlow and his sister.

Death
At 1 p.m. on December 28, 1938, Lawrence phoned the offices of M-G-M where she was to report to work that afternoon, claiming that she was ill. Sometime later in the afternoon, Lawrence ingested ant poison and cough syrup at her home in West Hollywood. Accounts differ as to how Lawrence was discovered; some media reports stated her neighbor Marian Menzer heard her screams, while others say that Lawrence called Menzer stating that she poisoned herself. Menzer called an ambulance, and Lawrence was rushed to Beverly Hills Emergency Hospital. Doctors were unable to save Lawrence, who died at 2:45 p.m. Lawrence left a suicide note in her home addressed to her housemate Bob Brinlow stating:

Dear Bob, 
Call Dr. Wilson. I am tired. Hope this works. Good bye, my darling. They can't cure me, so let it go at that. 
Lovingly, Florence – P.S. You've all been swell guys. Everything is yours.

Lawrence's death was ruled a "probable suicide" owing to her "ill health". The Motion Picture & Television Fund paid for Lawrence's funeral, held on December 30, and for her unmarked grave in the Hollywood Cemetery (now Hollywood Forever Cemetery) in Hollywood. Her grave remained unmarked until 1991, when an anonymous British actor paid for a memorial marker for her. It reads: "The Biograph Girl/The First Movie Star". The date of birth on Lawrence's headstone is given as 1890. This inaccuracy was also stated on her death certificate filled out by the coroner. Lawrence's biographer, Kelly R. Brown, owed this mistake to "Lawrence's own brand of fiction" as she routinely subtracted years off her age. The mistake was repeated by the Pierce Brothers Mortuary, where Lawrence's funeral was held, although most obituaries printed her correct year of birth: 1886.

Cultural references
In William J. Mann's novel The Biograph Girl (2000), Mann blends the facts of Lawrence's life with fiction. Instead of fading into oblivion and committing suicide, Lawrence, with the help of a doctor, fools the public into thinking she committed suicide. A journalist discovers Lawrence at the nursing home where she has lived secretly, and he decides to write a biography of her.

Filmography

Short subject

 The Automobile Thieves (1906)
 Daniel Boone (1907) as Boones' daughter
 The Boy, the Bust and the Bath (1907)
 Athletic American Girls (1907)
 Bargain Fiend; or, Shopping à la Mode (1907)
 The Shaughraun (1907) as Moya
 The Mill Girl (1907)
 The Despatch Bearer; or, Through the Enemy's Lines (1907)
 The Dispatch Bearer (1907)
 Cupid's Realm; or, A Game of Hearts (1908)
 Macbeth (1908) as Banquet Guest
 Romeo and Juliet (1908) as Juliet
 Lady Jane's Flight (1908) as Lady Jane
 The Viking's Daughter: The Story of the Ancient Norsemen (1908) as Theckla, the Viking's Daughter
 Love Laughs at Locksmiths; an 18th Century Romance (1908)
 The Bandit's Waterloo (1908)
 Salome (1908) as Salome
 Betrayed by a Handprint (1908) as Myrtle Vane
 The Girl and the Outlaw (1908) as Woman
 Behind the Scenes (1908) as Mrs. Bailey
 The Red Girl (1908) as The Red Girl
 The Heart of O'Yama (1908) as O'Yama
 Where the Breakers Roar (1908) as At the Beach
 A Smoked Husband (1908) as Mrs. Bibbs
 Richard III (1908)
 The Stolen Jewels (1908) as Mrs. Jenkins
 The Devil (1908) as A Model
 The Zulu's Heart (1908) as The Boer's Wife
 Father Gets in the Game (1908) as First Couple
 Ingomar, the Barbarian (1908) as Parthenia
 The Vaquero's Vow (1908) as Wedding Party / In Bar
 The Planter's Wife (1908) as Tomboy Nellie
 Romance of a Jewess (1908) as Ruth Simonson
 The Call of the Wild (1908) as Gladys Penrose
 Concealing a Burglar (1908) as Mrs. Brown
 Antony and Cleopatra (1908) as Cleopatra
 After Many Years (1908) as Mrs. John Davis
 The Pirate's Gold (1908)
 The Taming of the Shrew (1908) as Katharina
 The Song of the Shirt (1908) as Working Woman – 1st Sister
 A Woman's Way (1908)
 The Ingrate (1908) as The Trapper's Wife
 An Awful Moment (1908)
 The Clubman and the Tramp (1908) as Bridget / Dinner Guest
 Julius Caesar (1908) as Calpurnia
 Money Mad (1908) as Bank Customer / Landlady
 The Valet's Wife (1908) as Nurse
 The Feud and the Turkey (1908) as Nellie Caufield's Sister
 The Reckoning (1908) as The Wife
 The Test of Friendship (1908) as Jennie Colman
 The Dancer and the King: A Romantic Story of Spain (1908)
 The Christmas Burglars (1908) as Mrs. Martin
 Mr. Jones at the Ball (1908) as Mrs. Jones
 The Helping Hand (1908) as At Brothel / Wedding Guest
 A Calamitous Elopement (1908)
 One Touch of Nature (1909) as Mrs. John Murray
 Mrs. Jones Entertains (1909) as Mrs. Jones
 The Honor of Thieves (1909) as Rachel Einstein
 The Sacrifice (1909) as Mrs. Hardluck
 Those Boys! (1909) as The Maid
 The Criminal Hypnotist (1909) as The Maid
 The Fascinating Mrs. Francis (1909) as Visitor
 Mr. Jones Has a Card Party (1909) as Mrs. Jones
 Those Awful Hats (1909) as Theatre Audience (uncredited)
 The Cord of Life (1909) as Woman in Tenement
 The Girls and Daddy (1909) as Dr. Payson's First Daughter
 The Brahma Diamond (1909) as The Guard's Sweetheart
 A Wreath in Time (1909) as Mrs. John Goodhusband
 Tragic Love (1909) as The Maid / In Factory
 The Curtain Pole (1909) as Mrs. Edwards
 His Ward's Love (1909) as The Reverend's Ward
 The Joneses Have Amateur Theatricals (1909) as Mrs. Jones
 The Politician's Love Story (1909)
 The Golden Louis (1909)
 Trying to Get Arrested (1909) as Nanny
 At the Altar (1909) as Girl at Wedding
 Saul and David (1909)
 The Prussian Spy (1909) as The Maid
 His Wife's Mother (1909) as Mrs. Jones
 A Fool's Revenge (1909)
 The Wooden Leg (1909) as Claire
 The Roue's Heart (1909) as Noblewoman
 The Salvation Army Lass (1909) as Mary Wilson
 The Lure of the Gown (1909) as Veronica
 I Did It (1909)
 The Deception (1909) as Mabel Colton
 And a Little Child Shall Lead Them (1909)
 The Medicine Bottle (1909) as Mrs. Ross
 Jones and His New Neighbors (1909) as Mrs. Jones
 A Drunkard's Reformation (1909) as Woman In the Play
 Trying to Get Arrested (1909) as The Nanny
 The Road to the Heart (1909) as Miguel's daughter
 Schneider's Anti-Noise Crusade (1909) as Mrs. Schneider
 The Winning Coat (1909) as Lady-in-Waiting
 A Sound Sleeper (1909) as Second Woman
 Confidence (1909) as Nellie Burton
 Lady Helen's Escapade (1909) as Lady Helen
 A Troublesome Satchel (1909) as In Crowd
 The Drive for Life (1909) as Mignon
 Lucky Jim (1909) as Wedding Guest
 Tis an Ill Wind that Blows No Good (1909) as Mary Flinn
 The Eavesdropper (1909)
 The Note in the Shoe (1909) as Ella Berling
 One Busy Hour (1909) as Customer
 The French Duel (1909) as Nurse
 Jones and the Lady Book Agent (1909) as Mrs. Jones
 A Baby's Shoe (1909) as The Poor Mother
 The Jilt (1909) as Mary Allison – Frank's Sister
 Resurrection (1909) as Katucha
 The Judgment of Solomon (1909)
 Two Memories (1909) as Party Guest
 Eloping with Auntie (1909) as Margie
 What Drink Did (1909) as Mrs. Alfred Lucas
 Eradicating Aunty (1909) as Flora – Aunty's Ward
 The Lonely Villa (1909)
 Her First Biscuits (1909) as Mrs. Jones
 The Peachbasket Hat (1909) as Mrs. Jones
 The Way of Man (1909) as Mabel Jarrett
 The Necklace (1909)
 The Country Doctor (1909) as Mrs. Harcourt
 The Cardinal's Conspiracy (1909) as Princess Angela
 Tender Hearts (1909) - minor role
 Sweet and Twenty (1909) as Alice's Sister
 Jealousy and the Man (1909) as Mrs. Jim Brooks
 The Slave (1909) as Nerada
 The Mended Lute (1909) as Rising Moon
 Mr. Jones' Burglar (1909) as Mrs. Jones
 Mrs. Jones' Lover (1909) as Mrs. Jones
 The Hessian Renegades (1909)
 Lines of White on a Sullen Sea (1909)
 Love's Stratagem (1909) as The Girl
 Nursing a Viper (1909)
 The Forest Ranger's Daughter (1909) as The Forest Ranger's Daughter
 Her Generous Way (1909)
 Lest We Forget (1909)
 The Awakening of Bess (1909) as Bess
 Mrs. Jones Entertains (1909) as Mrs. Jones
 The Awakening (1909)
 The Winning Punch (1910)
 The Right of Love (1910)
 The Tide of Fortune (1910)
 Never Again (1910) as Mrs. Henpecker, Temperance Crusader
 The Coquette's Suitors (1910)
 Justice in the Far North (1910)
 The Blind Man's Tact (1910)
 Jane and the Stranger (1910) as Jane
 The Governor's Pardon (1910)
 The New Minister (1910)
 Mother Love (1910) as The Mother
 The Broken Oath (1910)
 The Time-Lock Safe (1910) as The Mother
 His Sick Friend (1910) as The Wife
 The Stage Note (1910)
 Transfusion (1910)
 The Miser's Daughter (1910) as The Miser's Daughter
 His Second Wife (1910)
 The Rosary (1910)
 The Maelstrom (1910)
 The New Shawl (1910) as Marie
 Two Men (1910) as The Orphan
 The Doctor's Perfidy (1910)
 The Eternal Triangle (1910) as The Wife
 The Nichols on Vacation (1910) as Mrs. Nichols
 A Reno Romance (1910) as Grace
 A Discontented Woman (1910)
 A Self-Made Hero (1910) as The Girl
 A Game for Two (1910) as Mrs. Henderson
 The Call of the Circus (1910)
 Old Heads and Young Hearts (1910)
 Bear Ye One Another's Burden (1910) as Mrs. George Rand
 The Irony of Fate (1910)
 Once Upon a Time (1910)
 Among the Roses (1910) as The Rose Girl
 The Senator's Double (1910)
 The Taming of Jane (1910) as Jane
 The Widow (1910) as The Widow
 The Right Girl (1910)
 Debt (1910)
 Pressed Roses (1910)
 All the World's a Stage (1910)
 The Count of Montebello (1910) as The Heiress
 The Call (1910)
 The Forest Ranger's Daughter (1910)
 The Mistake (1910)
 His Bogus Uncle (1911) as The Object of Their Affection
 Age Versus Youth (1911) as Nora Blake
 A Show Girl's Stratagem (1911) as Ethel Lane
 The Test (1911) as Miss Gillman
 Nan's Diplomacy (1911) as Nan
 Vanity and Its Cure (1911) as Effie Hart
 His Friend, the Burglar (1911) as Mrs. Tom Dayton – The Wife
 The Actress and the Singer (1911) as The Actress
 Her Artistic Temperament (1911) as Flo
 Her Child's Honor (1911) as The Mother
 The Wife's Awakening (1911) as The Wife
 Opportunity and the Man (1911) as Flora Hamilton
 The Two Fathers (1911) as Gladys
 The Hoyden (1911) as Gladys Weston
 The Sheriff and the Man (1911)
 A Fascinating Bachelor (1911) as The Nurse
 That Awful Brother (1911) as Florence
 Her Humble Ministry (1911) as The Reformed Woman
 A Good Turn (1911)
 The State Line (1911) as The Sheriff's Daughter
 A Game of Deception (1911) as The Actress
 The Professor's Ward (1911) as Edith – The Professor's Ward
 Duke De Ribbon Counter (1911) as Lillian De Mille
 Higgenses Versus Judsons (1911) as Freda Judson
 The Little Rebel (1911) as Rosalind Trevaine
 Always a Way (1911) as Ruth Craven
 The Snare of Society (1911) as Mary Williams
 During Cherry Time (1911) as Violet – the Country Girl
 The Gypsy (1911) as Zara – the Gypsy
 Her Two Sons (1911) as The Younger Brother's Wife
 Through Jealous Eyes (1911) as Flo – the Doctor's Office Nurse
 A Rebellious Blossom (1911) as Flo = the Rebellious Daughter
 The Secret (1911) as Diana Stanhope
 Romance of Pond Cove (1911) as Florence Earle
 The Story of Rosie's Rose (1911) as Rosie Carter
 The Life Saver (1911) as Jessie Storm – the Local Girl
 The Matchmaker (1911) as Evelyn Bruce – the Young Governess
 The Slavey's Affinity (1911) as Peggy – a Boarding House Drudge
 The Maniac (1911) as Dora Elsmore
 A Rural Conqueror (1911) as Marjorie Thorne
 One on Reno (1911) as Mrs. Appleby
 Aunt Jane's Legacy (1911) as Bessie Elkins – the Niece
 His Chorus Girl Wife (1911) as Sybil Sanford – a Chorus Girl
 A Blind Deception (1911) as Ellen Austin – the Nurse
 A Head for Business (1911) as Phyllis Moore
 A Girlish Impulse (1911) as Gladys Stevens
 Art Versus Music (1911) as Ethel Vernon
 The American Girl (1911)
 Flo's Discipline (1911)
 A Village Romance (1912) as Flo – the Country Girl
 The Players (1912) as Flo Lakewood
 Not Like Other Girls (1912) as Flo
 Taking a Chance (1912) as Mrs. Flo Mills
 The Mill Buyers (1912) as Flo
 The Chance Shot (1912) as Flo
 Her Cousin Fred (1912) as Flo Ballard
 The Winning Punch (1912) as Nellie Wilson
 After All (1912) as Margie
 All for Love (1912) as Flo
 Flo's Discipline (1912) as Florence Dow
 The Advent of Jane (1912) as Dr. Jane Bixby
 Tangled Relations (1912) as Florence the Governess
 Betty's Nightmare (1912) as Betty
 The Cross-Roads (1912) as Annabel Spaulding
 The Angel of the Studio (1912) as Roxie
 The Redemption of Riverton (1912) as June Martin
 Sisters (1912) as Annie / Mary (twin sisters)
 The Lady Leone (1912) as Lady Leone Mervyn
 A Surgeon's Heroism (1912)
 The Closed Door (1913) as Florence Ashleigh
 The Girl o'the Woods (1913) as Mab Hawkins
 The Spender (1913) as Flo
 His Wife's Child (1913) as Flo
 Unto the Third Generation (1913) as Esther Stern
 The Influence of Sympathy (1913) as The Wife
 A Girl and Her Money (1913) as Florence Kingsley
 Suffragette's Parade in Washington (1913)
 The Counterfeiter (1913)
 The Coryphee (1914) as Florence
 The Romance of a Photograph (1914) as Flo
 The False Bride (1914) as Florence Gould & Amy St. Clair (Dual Role)
 The Law's Decree (1914) as Flo
 The Stepmother (1914) as Flo
 The Honeymooners (1914) as Florence Blair
 Diplomatic Flo (1914) as Flo
 The Little Mail Carrier (1914) as Flo – the Little Mail Carrier
 The Pawns of Destiny (1914) as Flo
 The Bribe (1914)
 A Disenchantment (1914) as Flo – the Maid
 The Doctor's Testimony (1914) as Florence Lund
 A Singular Cynic (1914) as Flo Welton
 Her Ragged Knight (1914) as Flo – Bob's Ward
 The Mad Man's Ward (1914)
 The Honor of the Humble (1914) as Flo Soule – The Gamekeeper's Daughter
 Counterfeiters (1914) as Flo
 A Mysterious Mystery (1914) as Miss Lawrence
 The Woman Who Won (1914) as Florence Lloyd
 The Great Universal Mystery (1914) as 	Herself
 Face on the Screen (1917)
 The Love Craze (1918)

Features
 The Reg Girl (1908)
 A Singular Sinner (1914)
 Elusive Isabel (1916) as Isabel Thorne
 The Unfoldment (1922) as Katherine Nevin
 The Satin Girl (1923) as Sylvia
 Lucretia Lombard (1923)
 Gambling Wives (1924) as Polly Barker
 The Johnstown Flood (1926) as Townswoman (uncredited)
 The Greater Glory (1926) as Woman (uncredited)
 Sweeping Against the Winds (1930)
 Homicide Squad (1931)
 Pleasure (1931) as Martha
 The Hard Hombre (1931) as The Sister (uncredited)
 So Big (1932) as Mina (uncredited)
 Sinners in the Sun (1932) - minor role (uncredited)
 Secrets (1933) - minor role (uncredited)
 The Silk Express (1933) - minor role (uncredited)
 The Old Fashioned Way (1934, unverified) - minor role (uncredited)
 Man on the Flying Trapeze (1935, unverified) - minor role (uncredited)
 The Crusades (1935) - minor role (uncredited)
 Yellow Dust (1936) - minor role (uncredited)
 One Rainy Afternoon (1936) - minor role (uncredited)
 Hollywood Boulevard (1936) - minor role (scenes deleted)
 Night Must Fall (1937) - minor role (uncredited) (final film role)

See also

 Canadian pioneers in early Hollywood

References

Notes

Citations

Bibliography

External links

 
 Florence Lawrence at Women Film Pioneers Project

1886 births
1938 deaths
1938 suicides
20th-century American actresses
20th-century American inventors
20th-century Canadian actresses
Actresses from Hamilton, Ontario
American child actresses
American film actresses
American silent film actresses
American stage actresses
Burials at Hollywood Forever Cemetery
Canadian child actresses
Canadian emigrants to the United States
Canadian film actresses
Canadian inventors
Canadian people of English descent
Canadian people of Irish descent
Canadian silent film actresses
Canadian stage actresses
Vaudeville performers
Western (genre) film actresses
Women film pioneers
Suicides in California
Suicides by poison